Bankston (formerly, Bank's Tank, Bucksnort, and Byler) is an unincorporated community in Fayette County, Alabama, United States.

History
The community was originally known as Byler, as the road it was built on was constructed by John Byler. A water tank was then constructed by the railroad in the community, and it became known as Bank's Tank in honor of one of the railroad engineers. Later, the name was changed to Bankston. The community was also known as Bucksnort. A post office operated under the name Bucksnort from 1873 to 1894 and under the name Bankston thereafter.

References

Unincorporated communities in Fayette County, Alabama
Unincorporated communities in Alabama